The Wena or Vena is a left bank tributary of the Wardha River, in the Indian state of Maharashtra.It originates from the Mahadagad Hills in Nagpur District. It passes by the city of Hinganghat, one of the major cities of Vidarbha Region of Maharashtra. It joins the Wardha near the Village of Dhiwri Pipri. Wardha River later joins the Pranhita River and ultimately ends up joining the Godavari River.

References 

Rivers of Maharashtra
Rivers of India